Kenneth Edafe Ogba (1966/1967 – 27 June 2021) was a Nigerian politician and a member of the Delta State House of Assembly representing Isoko South Constituency 1 in the 7th Delta State House of Assembly.

Political career
On 9 March 2019, Kenneth Edafe Ogba, representing Peoples Democratic Party defeated Okiemute Essien of the All Progressives Congress and won the seat to represent Isoko South Constituency 1 at the Delta State House of Assembly. He received 15,973 votes, while Essien received 7,323 votes.

On 10 June 2019, Ogba replaced Orezi Esievo in the Delta State House of Assembly.

Personal life
Ogba is from Oleh, Isoko South, Delta State, Nigeria. His father is Lucky Ogba.

Death
Ogba slumped and died on 27 June 2021 at Oleh, Isoko South, Delta State, Nigeria.

References

1960s births
2021 deaths
Delta State politicians
Members of the Delta State House of Assembly
Peoples Democratic Party (Nigeria) politicians
Nigerian political candidates
People from Delta State